Manjakkorai is a village located near Gunaseelam in Tiruchirapalli district, Tamil Nadu state, India, which was once fully surrounded by nature and agriculture but no longer, because of sand excavation in the Kaveri river. The sand excavation is not run at this village and the people are not allowed to join the team, but villagers of nearby villages such as Amoor, Evoor and Ayyampalayam up to Thottiyam are permitted.

The young bloods arranged a festival with Gunaseelam named "Kaappu kattu ther thiruvizha" for Amman in 2013-2014 and in 2017 have arranged a festival named "Kutty kudi thiruvila" for Karuppu Sami.

Villages in Tiruchirappalli district